The council of the City of Perth was suspended from 2018 to 2020 due to issues arising from Councillor's behaviour.

Beginning on 2 March 2018, the council was managed by a panel of three Commissioners appointed by the Government of Western Australia, pending the results of a thrice-extended two-year inquiry into the activities of the suspended council. The report containing 250 findings and 341 recommendations, including suspected criminal behavior involving 23 individuals was released to the West Australian Parliament in August 2020. However,  no single prosecution resulted. Police charged a Councillor and his family with various offences but the charges were subsequently dropped. No apology or retraction was ever issued by authorities, despite the signal failure of the widely publicised "referrals" to result in further action.

The elected City of Perth comprises eight Councillors elected proportionally, with no divisions into wards. All Councillors are elected for a fixed four-year term of office. Elections are held every two years on the third Saturday in October, with four councillors elected for a four-year term at each election. The Lord Mayor is directly elected for a four-year term, with the Deputy Lord Mayor elected for one year by the Councillors at the first meeting of the council.

Council composition (at time of suspension) 
The Lord Mayor was elected in October 2015 and, pending the results of the public inquiry, all Councillors'  terms expired in October 2019. The makeup of the council at the time of its suspension, in order of election and term, is as follows:

Commissioner-led council

2020 elections
Elections for new Councillors and a new Lord Mayor following the suspension of the existing Councillors were held on 17 October 2020. Six candidates nominated for the position of Lord Mayor. They were media personality Basil Zempilas, retired magistrate Tim Schwass, former Australian Broadcasting Corporation journalist Di Bain, TV reporter Mark Gibson, startup community entrepreneur Brodie McCulloch and architect Sandy Anghie. Two candidates for the position of Lord Mayor also nominated as Council Candidates, Di Bain and Sandy Angie.

Homelessness, governance, reinvigorating retail spaces and creating a sustainable city are key platforms on which candidates are campaigning on.

Zempilas has faced public scrutiny over his potential conflicts of interests after radio interviews by Russell Woolf on ABC Radio and Gareth Parker on Radio 6PR.Bain released a list of potential conflicts in the City of Perth connected to her or her husband amounting to $95.75 million, including a private equity firm that owns a suite of buildings in the CBD. McCulloch's company Spacecubed has refused a $15,000 City of Perth economic development grant awarded before his campaign announcement citing it as an example of strong governance and decision making.

Zempilas was elected Lord Mayor with 29.44% of the popular vote with 41% turnout.

References

External links 

 
 
 

City of Perth
2020s in Western Australia